The 1970 Australian Sports Car Championship was an Australian motor racing competition for Group A Sports Cars, Group B Improved Production Sports Cars and Group D Series Production Sports Cars. It was authorised by the Confederation of Australian Motor Sport as an Australian National Title.

The title, which was the second Australian Sports Car Championship, was won by Peter Woodward, driving an Elfin 350 Coventry Climax.

Schedule
The championship was contested over three heats with one race per heat.
 Heat 1, Endeavour Cup, Phillip Island, Victoria, 25 January
 Heat 2, RAC Trophy, Warwick Farm, New South Wales, 3 May
 Heat 3, Western Australian Sports Car Championship, Wanneroo Park, Western Australia, 16 August

Points system
Championship points were awarded on a 9-6-4-3-2-1 basis to the first six placegetters at each heat.

Championship standings

Notes and references

Further reading
 Australian Motor Racing Annual, 1971, page 58
 Jim Shepherd, A History of Australian Motor Sport, 1980, pages 169 – 170

External links
 1970 Endeavour Cup images & Official Souvenir Programme extracts Retrieved from www.racingsportscars.com on 22 June 2009
 1970 Western Australian race results Retrieved from www.terrywalkersplace.com au on 22 June 2009
 1970 Australian sports car racing images Retrieved from www.autopics.com.au on 22 June 2009

Australian Sports Car Championship
Sports Car Championship